Homochlodes lactispargaria is a species of geometrid moth in the family Geometridae. It is found in North America.

The MONA or Hodges number for Homochlodes lactispargaria is 6811.

References

Further reading

 

Lithinini
Articles created by Qbugbot
Moths described in 1861